Georgios Voulgarakis (born 4 June 1959 in Heraklion) is a Greek politician and the former Minister for Mercantile Marine, Aegean Sea and Island Policy.

Voulgarakis was born in Crete and holds a PhD in Political Marketing and Communication from the University of Athens. He is a member of the New Democracy party. He has been elected to parliament from the Athens A' Election Area constituency since the June 1989 parliamentary election and served as Deputy Minister for the Environment, Spatial Planning and Public Works from 3 December 1992 to 12 October 1993. He was Minister of Public Order in the government of Prime Minister Costas Karamanlis from 10 March 2004, at the difficult period of Athens Olympic Games 2004, until a cabinet reshuffle on 14 February 2006, when he was named Minister of Culture instead. This was considered a demotion in the wake of a phone-tapping scandal.

A Greek prosecutor has backed claims by a group of Pakistani men that they were abducted by Greek and British intelligence agents in the wake of the London bombings. Georgios Voulgarakis denied any involvement but main opposition party PASOK and Human Rights Groups called for the resignation of Voulgarakis from his cabinet position.

On May 30, 2006, Voulgarakis survived a bombing. A far-left Greek terrorist group, Revolutionary Struggle, placed over two pounds of explosives strapped to a bicycle near his residence, and then detonated the device by remote control. No injuries resulted from the explosion, but four parked cars and a school building were damaged. It is unclear whether  this was an attempted assassination.

Following New Democracy's victory in the September 2007 parliamentary election, Voulgarakis was moved from his position as Minister for Culture to become Minister of Mercantile Marine, Aegean Sea and Island Policy in the Cabinet sworn in on 19 September 2007. One of the biggest successes was the hiring of a part of the port of Piraeus to the China's Cosco Pacific. On September 12, 2008 the Minister Voulgarakis resigned from his position, by touchiness, because the name of his wife was involved in the case (land-exchange) of Vatopedi monastery in Mount Athos. After 2 years legal research, the Greek Parliament and particularly Voulgarakis’ political opponents (PASOK party) acquitted him to involvement to this case (November 2010).

References

External links
Personal website
Biography on Greek Parliament website

1959 births
Living people
Politicians from Heraklion
New Democracy (Greece) politicians
Greek MPs 2004–2007
Greek MPs 2007–2009
Government ministers of Greece
National and Kapodistrian University of Athens alumni
Culture ministers of Greece
Ministers of Public Order of Greece